Richard Durrant Dip RCM, ARCM, FLCM (born Brighton, Sussex, 2 November 1962) is an English guitarist and composer. He studied guitar, cello, and composition at the Royal College of Music in London between 1981 and 1986. Since his debut at the Purcell Room, London in July 1986. Richard Durrant has gained an international reputation as one of the great guitarists of his generation. He has pursued both performance and composition in an unconventional career that has avoided categorisation and he has built a faithful, ever expanding audience who warm to his unpretentious manner and natural skills of communication. He is one of the only classical guitar virtuosi who performs standing up.

Work
Durrant’s compositions include ‘The Girl at the Airport’ (for guitar and strings released 2016, recorded with the City of Prague Philharmonic Strings July 2015), ‘Cycling Music’ (for guitar, sequencers and bicycle percussion, released 2014), ‘The Polar Bear’ (for solo guitar with narrator, released 2013 and featuring the voice of Barry Cryer), ’Wilbury Summer’ (released 1997), ‘The Rucenitsa Guitar Quartet' (flute, guitar, viola and cello) and 'Superluminal' (voice, guitar, string-quartet & electronics). There is also a very early Clarinet Sonata (1982) and other instrumental works including numerous guitar solos (‘La Isla del Paraguay’, ‘Apreton de Manos’, ‘The Early Learning Sonata’), children’s songs and folk tunes as well as music for the BBC, including the BBC1 skating penguins logo & music for the CBBC cartoon series ‘Metalheads' (Telemagination). Richard Durrant has written, and sung, numerous songs for BBC Schools TV programmes Numbertime and Watch. He has also produced recordings for other artists including The Ukulele Orchestra of Great Britain (‘The Secret of Life’ 2004) and Don Partridge (‘The Highwayman’ 2002).

In the early 1990s Durrant toured as lead guitarist with the band Sky. This was their last UK tour. Venues included the Barbican and The Royal Festival Hall, London. He went on to perform regularly with Herbie Flowers.[2]

One of his more challenging performances is a reinterpretation of Steve Reich's Electric Counterpoint for soloist and 20 pre-recorded guitars. His concerts are difficult to categorise as he covers many styles and often includes improvisations and electronic treatments – but he is, at his core, a classical performer.

Career
By the time he attended the Royal College of Music, Richard Durrant was an experienced performer with a growing reputation. The fact that he spent much of his time at college singing Bob Dylan songs in London's tube stations hinted that this musician was unlikely to follow a conventional route through the profession. Indeed, following his debut recital at the South Bank, London in 1986, Richard turned sharply left and pursued his diverse interests in electro/acoustic music, improvisation, composition and multi-media. These interests have, in part, contributed to Durrant treading a difficult and at times solitary path through the music business. His career, firmly outside the classical establishment, is noteworthy as much for its display of versatility as this musician's tendency towards perfectionism.

For several years Durrant toured a solo show billed as "Richard Durrant – The Guitar Whisperer". The show used projections of specially commissioned, short films as occasional backdrops in this multi-media entertainment which was built around a classical guitar recital. Durrant also likes to include his striking interpretations of music by J.S. Bach on ‘wrong’ instruments such as banjo, tenor guitar and ukulele.

In 2014 Durrant released his minimalist styled album Cycling Music. To promote the album and also to raise money for charity (The Big C 2014 and the Cyclist Defence Fund – CDF – 2015) he has toured over 3,000 miles around the UK with his one-man show cycling the whole production from gig to gig on the back of his bike. The music from Cycling Music was used by the BBC during their coverage of Le Tour 2014. Richard’s Cycling Music tour was featured on ITV’s The Cycling Show in July 2014.

In recent years Richard Durrant has visited many UK venues including the Hawth Theatre Crawley, Norwich Playhouse, The Stables Wavendon, Yvonne Arnaud Guildford, Brighton Dome, BBC Proms Celebration in Trafalgar Square, Keswick Theatre by the Lake, Theatre Severn, The Royal Albert Hall (with the Royal Philharmonic Orchestra), Rose Theatre Tewkesbury, The Stables Milton Keynes, Bedford Prom in the Park, Aros Centre Isle of Skye, Rose Theatre, Kingston, Epsom Playhouse, Birmingham Conservatoire, The De La Warr Pavilion, Mold Theatr Clywd and the New Wolsey, Ipswich. He has also performed a large number of concerts over many years for the UK Rural Touring Network.

UK festival performances include Wildlife Festival,  Sidmouth, Adur, Brighton, and the International Guitar Festival of Great Britain. In Europe he has performed solo concerts in Belgium, Denmark, France, Holland, Switzerland and Spain.

Durrant has played many concerts with the Brighton Philharmonic Orchestra, as well as the Hanover Orchestra, BBC Midlands Orchestra, the Royal Philharmonic Orchestra.

In May 2011, Durrant was invited to launch his latest solo album in Paraguay and, whilst there, in recognition of his services as a champion of Agustín Barrios Mangoré, he was officially proclaimed an Illustrious Visitor to Asuncion. He has since returned to South America many times playing in Paraguay, Buenos Aires, Argentina and Arequipa, Peru.

In November 2010 Durrant was awarded a fellowship of the London College of Music for professional achievement. He has been an official ambassador for the Brighton Youth Orchestra since 2015.

He was chairman of the Adur Festival for many years until his resignation in 2005. He is still closely involved with the arts scene in West Sussex especially since the opening of The Ropetackle Arts Centre in Shoreham by Sea. He is a passionate supporter of community arts projects. He is a regular visitor to local schools wherever he is performing. In October 2002, as recognition of his work promoting art in the community, Richard was presented with a Daily Mail Golden Jubilee Award by The Prince of Wales.

Solo studio albums
Sarabande
The Music of Castelnuovo Tedesco  
Music From the Colourdome 
Recuerdos – Guitar Classics
The Number 26 Bus to Paraguay
Hijo de Hombre
Christmas Guitars
Cycling Music
The Girl at the Airport
A Quiet Word From the 13th Century
Stringhenge
Rewilding
The Sleep of a King

Collaborative albums
Pandora  (with Herbie Flowers)
Nick & Dick – Acoustic Collaborations (with Nick Pynn)
Guitar and Harpsichord (with Howard Beach)
Durrant y Ledesma (with Ismael Ledesma)

Video releases
Richard Durrant – The Guitar Whisperer

References

External links
Official website
Rpo.co.uk
Brightonphil.org.uk

Youtube.com
Soundcloud.com
Facebook
Twitter

1962 births
Living people
Associates of the Royal College of Music
English male composers
English male guitarists
English record producers
People from Brighton
Place of birth missing (living people)
Sky (English/Australian band) members
21st-century English composers
21st-century British male musicians